The 1951 Albanian National Championship was the fourteenth season of the Albanian National Championship, the top professional league for association football clubs, since its establishment in 1930.

Overview
It was contested by 14 teams, and Dinamo Tirana won the championship.

League standings

Note: From 1951 to 1957 the cities clubs were named Puna.

Results

References
Albania - List of final tables (RSSSF)

Kategoria Superiore seasons
1
Albania
Albania